Major-General Robert Wallace Tudor Britten  (28 February 1922 – 11 July 1995) was a British Army officer.

Military career
Educated at Wellington College and Trinity College, Cambridge, Britten was commissioned into the Royal Engineers in 1941 during the Second World War. He became commanding officer of 1st Training Regiment Royal Engineers in 1964. He went on to be commander of 30th Engineer Brigade in 1967, Director of Equipment Management (Army) at the Ministry of Defence in 1970 and Deputy Quartermaster-General in 1971. His last appointment was as General Officer Commanding West Midlands District in 1973 before retiring in 1976.

In 1947 he married Elizabeth Mary Jane Davies; they had one son and one daughter.

References

 

1922 births
1995 deaths
Alumni of Trinity College, Cambridge
British Army major generals
British Army personnel of World War II
Companions of the Order of the Bath
People educated at Wellington College, Berkshire
Recipients of the Military Cross
Royal Engineers officers